Mount Lyell is a mountain on the Alberta–British Columbia border in western Canada. The mountain was named by James Hector in 1858 in recognition of Scottish geologist Sir Charles Lyell.


Geography
Mount Lyell is located on the Great Divide, which forms the BC-Alberta boundary in this area, in Banff National Park. Collectively, the five peaks, and the Mt. Lyell massif itself, are commonly referred to as 'the Lyells'. The mountain is the highest in the Lyell Group, a subrange of the Central Icefields in the Canadian Rockies.

In 1972, five distinct peaks on Mt. Lyell (formerly referred to as only Lyell 1 through 5 or L1 through L5), were named after Swiss mountain guides who settled in Golden, British Columbia in 1912. Running south to north along the interprovincial boundary, these peaks are:  Christian Peak (L5), Walter Peak (L4), and Ernest Peak (L3), named after Christian Hässler, Walter Feuz and Ernest Feuz. Located entirely in Alberta are Edward Peak (L2) and Rudolph Peak (L1), named after Edward Feuz Jr. and Rudolph Aemmer.

Mount Lyell marks the limit between the South Saskatchewan and Columbia watersheds.

Geology
Mount Lyell is composed of sedimentary rock laid down during the Precambrian to Jurassic periods. Formed in shallow seas, this sedimentary rock was pushed east and over the top of younger rock during the Laramide orogeny.  The Lyell Formation is named after Mount Lyell. Geology for all five subpeaks is identical due to their proximity to the central peak.

Climate
Based on the Köppen climate classification, Mount Lyell is located in a subarctic climate with cold, snowy winters, and mild summers. Temperatures can drop below  with wind chill factors below .

See also

List of mountains of Canada

References

Three-thousanders of Alberta
Three-thousanders of British Columbia
Canadian Rockies
Mountains of Banff National Park
Borders of British Columbia
Borders of Alberta
Great Divide of North America